The Heart Must Be Silent (German: Das Herz muß schweigen) is a 1944 German drama film directed by Gustav Ucicky and starring Paula Wessely, Mathias Wieman and Werner Hinz. It was produced by Wien Film in the Austrian capital of Vienna, which had been part of Greater Germany since the Anschluss of 1938. It was given further release by West German distributor Deutsche London Film in 1950.

The film's sets were designed by the art directors Fritz Jüptner-Jonstorff and Otto Niedermoser.

Cast
 Paula Wessely as Maximiliane Frey
 Mathias Wieman as Dr. Paul Holzgruber
 Werner Hinz as Freiherr von Bonin
 Gerda Brunner as Mimi von Bonin
 Erik Frey as Robert
 Rolf Truxa as Leopold Welischer
 Alfred Neugebauer as Sanitätsrat Wendemuth
 Karl Skraup as Herr Welischer
 Lotte Lang as Emma Welischer
 Franz Böheim as Erich
 Mimi Shorp as Maria
 Rosl Dorena as Hilde
 Rudolf Brix as Junger Mann
 Ernst Pröckl as Fritz
 Lotte Martens as Junge Dame
 Waltraut Klein as Junge Dame
 Karl Ehmann as Geßner, Diener

References

Bibliography
 Von Dassanowsky, Robert. Austrian Cinema: A History. McFarland, 2005.

External links 
 

1944 films
German drama films
Austrian drama films
Films of Nazi Germany
1940s German-language films
Films directed by Gustav Ucicky
1944 drama films
1940s German films